Trouble in Texas is a 1937 American Western film directed by Robert N. Bradbury (as R.N. Bradbury) and starring Tex Ritter, his horse White Flash, Rita Hayworth (billed as "Rita Cansino") and Yakima Canutt. The supporting cast features Earl Dwire and Glenn Strange.

Plot
Many Middleton Rodeo winning cowboys are murdered or disappear, one being Tex Masters' brother. Tex teams up with undercover policewoman Carmen Serano for justice and vengeance.

Cast 
Tex Ritter as Tex Masters
White Flash as Tex's horse
Rita Hayworth as Carmen Serano (billed as "Rita Cansino")
Yakima Canutt as Henchman Squint Palmer
Charles King as Henchman Pinto
Horace Murphy as Sidekick Lucky
Earl Dwire as Barker
Tex Cooper as Rodeo Announcer
Hal Price as Federal Officer
Glenn Strange as Middleton Sheriff
Jack C. Smith as Banker Bix
The Texas Tornadoes as Musicians

Soundtrack
 Tex Ritter - "Down the Colorado Trail" (Written by Rudy Sooter as Rudolph Sooter)
 Tex Ritter with Rudy Sooter and Texas Tornados Band - "The Rodeo Song" (Written by Tex Ritter and Frank Sanucci)
 Rudy Sooter with the Texas Tornados Band - "The Cowboy Band" (Written by Rudy Sooter as Rudolph Sooter)
 Tex Ritter with Rudy Sooter and Texas Tornados Band - "A Cowboy's Lament" (Traditional)

External links

1937 films
1930s English-language films
Films set in Texas
Grand National Films films
American black-and-white films
1937 Western (genre) films
American Western (genre) films
Films directed by Robert N. Bradbury
1930s American films